Ayelet Tsabari is an Israeli-Canadian writer.

Biography
She was born in Israel into a large family of Yemeni descent. She studied at the Simon Fraser University Writers' Studio and the University of Guelph MFA program in Creative Writing. Her first book, the collection of short stories The Best Place on Earth, was published by HarperCollins Canada in 2013, and by Penguin Random House in the USA in March 2016.

The Best Place on Earth was the recipient of the 2015 Sami Rohr Prize, the 2016 Edward Lewis Wallant, and was long listed for the Frank O’Connor International Short Story Award in 2013. The book was a New York Times Book Review Editors’ Choice, a Kirkus Review Best Debut Fiction of 2016, and has been published internationally. 

Tsabari's second book, the memoir in essays The Art of Leaving, was published by HarperCollins Canada and by Penguin Random House in the USA in February 2019. The book won Canadian Jewish Literary Award for Memoir and was a finalist for the Hilary Weston Writers’ Trust Prize for Nonfiction. Essays from the book have won several awards including a National Magazine Award (Silver) and a Western Magazine Award in Canada.

Her reviews, essays, and op-eds have appeared in The New York Times, The Globe and Mail, Foreign Policy, The Forward, and The National Post.

She teaches creative writing at the University of King's College MFA Program in creative nonfiction.

References

Living people
Israeli people of Yemeni-Jewish descent
21st-century Israeli writers
Year of birth missing (living people)
Israeli non-fiction writers
21st-century Israeli women writers
21st-century Canadian non-fiction writers
21st-century Canadian women writers
Canadian writers of Asian descent
Canadian women non-fiction writers
Jewish Canadian writers
Israeli emigrants to Canada
Jewish women writers